Inquisitor plurivaricis is a species of sea snail, a marine gastropod mollusk in the family Pseudomelatomidae, the turrids and allies.

Description

The length of the shell attains 41.5 mm, its diameter 12.5 mm.

Distribution
This marine species occurs off the Nansha Islands, China

References

External links
  Baoquan Li 李宝泉 & R.N. Kilburn, Report on Crassispirinae Morrison, 1966 (Mollusca: Neogastropoda: Turridae) from the China Seas; Journal of Natural History 44(11):699-740 · March 2010; DOI: 10.1080/00222930903470086

plurivaricis
Gastropods described in 2010